Tayemeh (also Romanized as Ţāyemeh, Ţa’emeh, and Ţā’emeh) is a village in Kamazan-e Sofla Rural District, Zand District, Malayer County, Hamadan Province, Iran. At the 2006 census, its population was 520, in 136 families.

References 

Populated places in Malayer County